Fabian Bäcker (born 28 May 1990) is a German professional footballer who plays as a forward for Germania Ober-Roden II.
He is also a football coach of Germania Ober-Roden

Career

Club
Bäcker was born in Rotenburg an der Fulda, Hesse. He passed through numerous youth teams in Borussia Mönchengladbach and  brought himself to notice when he scored 42 goals in 48 games in the Under-19-Bundesliga. In parallel, he played in Borussia's under-23 team in the Regionalliga, where he achieved two goals in 13 games. In the 2009–10 season, he signed a professional contract with Borussia Mönchengladbach.

Already in his second friendly game against SV Wacker Gotha, he succeeded in scoring a hat-trick only eight minutes into the game. On 16 January 2010, Bäcker scored his first Bundesliga goal against VfL Bochum. In April 2011, Bäcker signed a two-year  contract with Alemannia Aachen.

National team
Bäcker played for various German youth teams

References

External links
 

1990 births
Living people
People from Rotenburg an der Fulda
Sportspeople from Kassel (region)
German footballers
Germany youth international footballers
Association football forwards
Borussia Mönchengladbach players
Borussia Mönchengladbach II players
Kickers Offenbach players
Bundesliga players
2. Bundesliga players
3. Liga players
Footballers from Hesse